Ross Patrick Denny (born 1955) is a British diplomat who has been the British Ambassador to Costa Rica and Nicaragua since 2015. He was appointed as ambassador on 3 February 2015 and succeeded Sharon Campbell and Chris Campbell in September that year.

Pre-consular career
Before joining the Foreign Service, Denny served in the Royal Navy from 1972 until 1979.

Consular career
Denny joined the Foreign and Commonwealth Office (FCO) in 1979 and first worked in the West Indies and Atlantic Department. In 1980, he was moved to be an Accountant for the British Embassy in Santiago, Chile and stayed there for three years. He was then moved to the British Embassy in Doha, Qatar to be an Assistant Management Officer.

In 1985, Denny was posted to Warsaw as Vice Consul and from 1988 to 1990 he was a Desk Officer in the Personnel Department of the FCO. He then became Desk Officer for the Papua New Guinea and South West Pacific Department and in 1992 was sent to the Hague as a Second Secretary.

Denny was made Deputy Head of Mission in Luanda, Angola under Ambassador John Thompson from 2002 to 2005. In 2008, he was appointed the Administrator of Ascension. He remained in the post for three years before he was made United Kingdom Ambassador to Bolivia. He stayed as Bolivian ambassador until 2015 when he was made Ambassador to Costa Rica and Non-Resident Ambassador to Nicaragua.

In 2018, Denny said that he was "deeply concerned" about the violence of the 2018 Nicaraguan protests and called on the government to "uphold ... the human rights of all Nicaraguans".

Personal life
Denny has a wife and four children, two sons and two daughters. He can speak Spanish, Brazilian Portuguese and Dutch.

References

Living people
Ambassadors of the United Kingdom to Costa Rica
Ambassadors of the United Kingdom to Nicaragua
Members of HM Diplomatic Service
1955 births
People from Southampton
20th-century British diplomats